The Practice of Joy Before Death is an album by the American alternative rock band Pond, released in 1995. Its first single was "Glass Sparkles in Their Hair".

Production
The album was produced by Pond and Adam Kaspar. Pond started the album in a basement studio, using an 8-track and recording at different times and with different instruments; Kaspar then remixed some of the songs. 

The band filtered its vocals through a megaphone on "Carpenter Ant"; they used a sitar on "Sundial". "Van" is an ode to Pond's mode of transportation during tours.

Critical reception

Trouser Press stated: "Largely repudiating pop, the trio ... head toward the emo-core of bands like Polvo and Sunny Day Real Estate." The Calgary Herald concluded that "few musicians can actually balance raw instinct and fashionable music so beautifully." The Vancouver Sun determined that Pond "churn out a kind of guitar pop that comes from growing up with Pere Ubu, the Pixies and Sonic Youth as songwriting models." Robert Christgau praised "Van" and "Sideroad".

The Washington Post wrote that Pond's "sound is neither pop nor ('Carpenter Ant' aside) metal but swoony low-tech psychedelia; such trippy songs as 'Magnifier' and 'Glass Sparkles in Their Hair' employ droning, circular riffs and the heavily mutated sounds of toy pianos and (apparently) whatever else was lying around." Guitar Player called the album "utterly unpredictable indie-rock chock-full of melodic songs, deep textures, and moods that spirit you away with your balance shaken." The Philadelphia Inquirer opined that Pond "returns to the best elements of its previous effort, while managing to sound more accomplished." The Dallas Observer thought that "the sound is alternately beautiful and harrowing, songs that jangle along their way until they erupt into bizarre bursts of feedback or minor-chord riffs."
 
AllMusic wrote that "the less-is-more production and incisive songwriting make The Practice of Joy Before Death the best of Pond's three albums." The A.V. Club labeled The Practice of Joy Before Death the band's "masterpiece."

Track listing
 Sideroad
 Mubby's Theme
 Union
 Magnifier
 Patience
 Ol' Blue Hair
 Sundial
 Glass Sparkles in Their Hair
 Van
 Happy Cow Farm Family
 Carpenter Ant
 Artificial Turf
 Rock Collection
 Gagged & Bound

References

1995 albums
Sub Pop albums